Viktor Pavlovich Vashchenko (born 17 February 1965) is a former Russian professional footballer.

Club career
He made his professional debut in the Soviet Second League in 1985 for FC Mayak Kharkiv.

Honours
 Soviet Cup winner: 1988.

References

1965 births
People from Belgorod
Russian people of Ukrainian descent
Living people
Soviet footballers
Russian footballers
Association football defenders
FC Olympik Kharkiv players
FC Metalist Kharkiv players
FC Fakel Voronezh players
FC Lokomotiv Nizhny Novgorod players
Soviet Top League players
Russian Premier League players
Russian expatriate footballers
Expatriate footballers in Germany
Sportspeople from Belgorod Oblast